The 2008 Mosconi Cup, the 15th edition of the annual nine-ball pool competition between teams representing Europe and the United States, took place 11–14 December 2008 at the Hilton Conference Center in Portomaso, Malta.

Team Europe won the Mosconi Cup by defeating Team USA 11–5.


The teams

Results

Thursday, 11 December

Session 1

Friday, 12 December

Session 2

Saturday, 13 December

Session 3

Session 4

Sunday, 14 December

Session 5

Gallery

References

External links

 Official homepage

2008
2008 in cue sports
2008 in Maltese sport
International sports competitions hosted by Malta
December 2008 sports events in Europe